Thomas Bernard Colcolough (October 8, 1870 – December 10, 1919) was a professional baseball player.  He was a right-handed pitcher over parts of four seasons (1893–1895, 1899) with the Pittsburgh Pirates and New York Giants.  For his career, he compiled a 14–11 record in 47 appearances, with a 5.67 earned run average and 65 strikeouts.

Colcolough was born and later died in Charleston, South Carolina at the age of 49.

See also
 List of Major League Baseball annual saves leaders

References

1870 births
1919 deaths
Major League Baseball pitchers
Baseball players from South Carolina
Pittsburgh Pirates players
New York Giants (NL) players
Charleston Sea Gulls players
Atlanta Firecrackers players
Wilkes-Barre Coal Barons players
Bridgeport Orators players
19th-century baseball players